Parliamentary elections were held in Venda on 15 and 16 August 1973. The Venda Independence People's Party won 13 of the 18 elected seats in the Legislative Assembly.

Electoral system
The Legislative Assembly consisted of 60 seats, of which only 18 were elected. The remaining 42 seats were reserved for 25 Chiefs, 2 Headmen and a further 15 members appointed by Chiefs.

Results

References

Venda
Elections in Venda
August 1973 events in Africa